CTMO is a contraction of China Trademark Office.

External links
 CTMO
 ChinaTradeMarkOffice

See also
Trademark Law of the People's Republic of China

Government of China